Franklin Township is one of thirteen townships in Henry County, Indiana, United States. As of the 2010 census, its population was 1,157 and it contained 486 housing units.

Franklin Township was organized in 1830.

History
Richsquare Friends Meetinghouse and Cemetery was added to the National Register of Historic Places in 2006.

Geography
The stream of Applebutter Creek runs through this township.

Cities and towns
 Lewisville

Adjacent townships
 Henry Township (north)
 Liberty Township (northeast)
 Dudley Township (east)
 Washington Township, Rush County (south)
 Center Township, Rush County (southwest)
 Spiceland Township (west)

Cemeteries
The township contains one cemetery, Ebenezer.

Major highways
  Interstate 70
  U.S. Route 40
  State Road 3
  State Road 103

References
 
 United States Census Bureau cartographic boundary files

External links
 Indiana Township Association
 United Township Association of Indiana

Townships in Henry County, Indiana
Townships in Indiana
1830 establishments in Indiana